The Scania PRT-range (also known as Scania LPGRS-range or Scania PGRT-range), also referred to as new truck range or Scania's truck range, is the current range of trucks produced by the Swedish commercial vehicle manufacturer Scania. It was first introduced as the successor to the 4-series in spring 2004 with the high forward control cab Scania R-series, followed by the low forward control cab Scania P-series and bonneted cab Scania T-series later in the year. The bonneted model was discontinued in 2005. In 2007 the Scania G-series, a medium forward control cab was introduced and was derived from the R-series. The entire range is modular, giving a wide range of different configurations for different types of trucks. The trucks are available with engines ranging from a 9-litre I5 to a 16-litre V8, with the V8 only being available in the higher model. A second generation launched in August 2016, first was the Scania S-series being the first flat-floor model. In December 2017, a low-end version of the second generation, the Scania L-series, also launched.

First generation (2004-2017) 

The range was first launched with the R-series on 31 March 2004, replacing the R94, R114, R124, R144, and R164 of the 4-series. It had 65 percent of the same components as its predecessors, but with a new cab design, new interior and other technical improvements. Full-scale production started in Södertälje (Sweden) in April, Zwolle (the Netherlands) in May and in Angers (France) in June. At launch it was available with Euro III engines, but with a 420 hp Euro IV engine available from September. On 20 August, the P- and T-series were launched too, completing the new truck range and replacing the rest of the 4-series models. The new models made their public debut at the IAA commercial vehicle show in Hanover in late September. Production of the 4-series was continued at the Scania Latin America plant in São Bernardo do Campo (Brazil), but was from October 2004 relaunched as the Série Evolução (Evolution Series), featuring the new engines of the PRT-range and the same new model designation, but with the old 4-series cabs.

In October 2005, Scania decided to discontinue the bonneted T-series, having lost its market share over the years. Over the last decade the sales had been halved in Europe and gone down 90 percent in Latin America. In 2004, fewer than  bonneted Scania trucks were sold worldwide, meaning there was no longer a market for it. In late 2006, Scania launched a new low-entry version of the P-series cab, known as the CP19E, specially intended for garbage trucks, where the driver needs to get in and out quickly. This cab was targeted as a competitor to the Mercedes-Benz Econic.

On 5 September 2007, Scania launched the all-new G-series, with a cab height between the P-series and the R-series. It should not be confused with the old G cab of the 2- and 3-series, which was even lower than the P cab, nor with the G chassis of the 4-series (i.e. 94G). On 9 October 2007, the new range was also launched in Latin America, featuring all three P-, G- and R-series from the start. In April 2008, Scania unveiled their first ethanol-powered (ED95) trucks, having manufactured ethanol-powered buses for nearly two decades.

On 17 September 2009, an upgraded R-series was launched with many new features including a sharper exterior styling with larger grille openings, new interior details including the possibility of a factory-installed coffeemaker, new version of the Scania Opticruise gear system with automatic clutch and a driver support system. The G-series received the upgrade shortly afterwards, and the P-series during 2011. In 2014 the front air filters G & R - Series were given a redesign

In April 2010, Scania launched a new version of its V8 engine, allowing a maximum output of 730 hp and 3500 N·m in trucks, and preparing for the future Euro VI emission requirements. The new R 730 then became the most powerful large-scale production truck in the world, only to be surpassed by the Volvo FH16 750 (750 hp, 3550 N·m) in September 2011.

Special edition

Special Edition (Brazil) 
The Special Edition was a special edition based on Scania's range of trucks for the South American market (especially in Brazil), commemorating the 60 years of Scania Brasil. Inspired by the Brazilian-built Scania 3-series T113 bonneted truck from 1991, the special edition R series features an emblematic blue-sky colour which a combination of pink, lilac and purple from the previous T113. There were two options for the special edition, the Classic package featuring xenon headlamps, refrigerator compartment, and the package which adds polished aluminium wheels, steering wheel and leather seats. Sales commenced in July 2017.

Second generation/next gen (2016-present) 

Since Scania signed a deal with Porsche Engineering in August 2010, a completely new truck cab has been in development, known as a next generation. From early 2014, several masked prototypes have been spotted on roads in Sweden, Spain and Norway. It was officially launched at the Grand Palais in Paris on 23 August 2016. The launch included new R-series sleeper cab and the all-new S-series sleeper cab which offers a flat interior floor. Other cab heights, including R-series day cab, of the new generation will have a later launch. The first display of the new generation to a public audience occurred at the Elmia Lastbil fair in Jönköping, on 24 August. The second generation range features two touchscreen infotainment systems. The Base package has a 5-inch resolution, and the Premium package has a bigger, 7-inch resolution. In April 2017, the Premium package now supports for the first time – Apple CarPlay.

The low-end version called the L series was added to the lineup in December 2017.

Plug-in Hybrid and Fully-electric models were introduced in 2020.

Scania XT 

Introduced in September 2017, the Scania XT is the first independently tailor-made rugged package for the entire cab range with endless configurations available. Apart from its standard model, the XT features a steel bumper with which extended up to 150 millimetres, a protection shield, a towing device, high air intake and replaced standard side mirrors with reinforced ribbed rear view mirrors. It is certified for 40 tonnes, while enabling to pull other vehicles and equipment as well as to be towed when needed. Other features include slip proof steps, a power-adjustable dual-tone front seats embossed with a black leather, an orange stitching with "XT" logo, high-edge rubber mats, and further set apart from a number of exterior and interior options.  Optional include an electronic braking system (EBS) with discs or drums, new two-leaf parabolic front springs and enlarged wheel housings to accommodate larger than normal wheel/tyre combinations, can be specified together with two different vertical exhaust stack options. The XT can also have two touchscreen infotainment systems – a 5-inch base version and a 7-inch premium version. Deliveries began in late 2017.

Special edition 
The 1969–2019 V8 was a celebratory limited edition based on the R-series and S-series, commemorating the 50th anniversary of the 1969 introduction of Scania's original V8 engine. It was revealed in the UK in September 2019; with only 25 units of the right-hand-drive were made available there. In addition to the existing V8-powered 520-730 models which come as basic standard equipment, a range of unique features includes a distinctive livery in a choice of three anniversary colours to choose from: Ruby Red, Arctic Silver, and Sapphire Blue, "1969–2019 V8" anniversary logos on the rear mudflaps and wheel hubs, and exclusive puddle lamps. Other external features include chrome trim grille air intakes, side windows and door handles and a rectangular left-side exhaust pipe design. Additional luxury fitments in the 1969–2019 V8 edition include embossed leather seats with exclusive red V8 stitching, a microwave oven, coffee machine, and an optional 7-inch premium touchscreen infotainment system. Deliveries commenced in November 2019.
The 2021 Scania R410 A6X2NA Yak Edition was a celebratory limited edition based on the R-series, Scania Siam celebrates 35th Anniversary this year. With a long-term commitment to the Thai market, Scania Siam plans to expand continuously. Scania Siam strives to develop efficiency-enhancing services to improve the transport flow efficiencies, increase the customer's profitability, and drive the shift towards a sustainable transport system.

Engines 
Diesel engine versions of the new generation currently available in selected truck models as of 2019. A liquefied natural gas (LNG) was added into the lineup in late 2017, alongside a compressed natural gas (CNG) version.

Hybrid / Electric 
Based on the P-series and L-series of urban trucks, Scania adopted an electrification technology which was announced in September 2020.

Customers can also opt for either select five or nine batteries. The "25P" and "25L" (both, hence the name) for up to 250 kilometres (155 miles) using a single charge.

Model designation 
Scania use different model designations for different contexts. A simplified truck model designation is used for marketing and is visible in the grille. Another complete designation defines the characteristics of the chassis and the drivetrain, and a third designation defines the cab configuration.

Truck model 
The simplified truck model name consists of the cab type and horsepower, divided by a space. Examples: R 730, G 440, P 270.

Complete vehicle 
Cab type
 L: Lowest forward control cab
 P: Low forward control cab & crew cab
 G: Medium forward control cab
 R: High forward control cab
 S: Highest forward control cab with flat floor (next gen)
 T: Bonneted cab (2004-2005)
Power code
Approximation of the power rating in hp to the nearest ten. The power code has spaces on both sides.
Type of transport
 L: Long-distance haulage
 D: Distribution
 C: Construction
Chassis adaption
 A: Tractor unit (Articulated)
 B: Truck bodywork (Basic)
Wheel configuration
 4x2: two-axle
 4x4: two-axle, all-wheel drive
 6x2: tri-axle, rigid tag axle
 6x2/2: tri-axle, rigid pusher axle
 6x2/4: tri-axle, steered pusher axle
 6x2*4: tri-axle, steered tag axle
 6x4: tri-axle, double drive axle
 6x6: tri-axle, all-wheel drive
 8x2: four-axle, double front axle, rigid tag axle
 8x2/4: four-axle, steered pusher axle, rigid tag axle
 8x2*6: four-axle, double front axle, steered tag axle
 8x4: four-axle, double front axle, double drive axle
 8x4*4: four-axle, double drive axle, steered tag axle
 8x8: four-axle, all-wheel drive
Duty class
 M: Medium duty, for transport on even surfaces
 H: Heavy duty, for transport on uneven surfaces
 E: Extra heavy duty, for off-road transport
Chassis height
 E: Extra low
 L: Low
 N: Normal
 S: Semi high
 H: High
Suspension
 A: leaf-spring suspension front and air suspension rear
 B: air suspension front and rear
 Z: leaf-spring suspension front and rear

Examples:
 P 230 DB4x2MNA: Low forward control cab, 230 hp, distribution truck
 R 730 CA8x8EHZ: High forward control cab, 730 hp, four-axle all-wheel drive, off-road tractor unit
 S 500 LA6x4HNB: High, flat-floor control cab, 500 hp, tri-axle RWD for two axles, long-distance transport unit

Cab 
Cab type
The cab type consists of C and the corresponding letter for the main cab type; CP, CG, CR and CT.
Cab length
Interior distance between front and rear walls, measured in decimetres.
 14: Short cab
 16: Day cab
 19: Sleeper cab
 28: CrewCab (5−6 persons)
 31: Long CrewCab (6−8 persons)
 32: Extended sleeper cab
Roof height
 N: Normal
 L: Low
 E: Low boarding step, normal roof height (Low entry)
 H: High (Scania Highline)
 T: Full height (Scania Topline)

Examples:
 CP19E: Low entry cab, for garbage trucks
 CP31: Long crew cab, for fire engines
 CR19H: High-entry sleeper cab, for long-distance haulage trucks

References

External links 

 Trucks Scania AB

PRT
Vehicles introduced in 2004
Plug-in hybrid vehicles